John E. Benington (December 31, 1921 – September 10, 1969) was an American college basketball coach. The picture listed of John Benington is incorrect. It is not him. This is from

his grand-daughter. 

The Findlay, Ohio native played college basketball for two seasons at the University of San Francisco, where he captained the squad that won the 1949 National Invitation Tournament under Pete Newell. He then became assistant basketball coach at Michigan State University (1950–1956) under Newell and Forddy Anderson.

He served a combined 14 seasons as head men's basketball coach at Drake University (1956–1958), St. Louis University (1958–1965) and Michigan State (1965–1969). He led Saint Louis to four NIT appearances including the finals of the 1961 NIT where they lost to Providence.

Benington died of a massive heart attack at age 47 after jogging. He was found after hours in Jenison Fieldhouse by his wife and assistant coach.

Head coaching record

References

1921 births
1969 deaths
American men's basketball coaches
American men's basketball players
Basketball coaches from Ohio
Basketball players from Ohio
College men's basketball head coaches in the United States
Drake Bulldogs men's basketball coaches
Michigan State Spartans men's basketball coaches
People from Findlay, Ohio
Saint Louis Billikens athletic directors
Saint Louis Billikens men's basketball coaches
San Francisco Dons men's basketball players